Purple Mountain, elevation , is a mountain peak in the southern section of the Gallatin Range in Yellowstone National Park, in the U.S. state of Montana. The Purple Mountain Trail ascends to the summit from Madison Junction. It is located near the Lava Creek Tuff.

See also
 Mountains and mountain ranges of Yellowstone National Park

Notes

Mountains of Wyoming
Mountains of Yellowstone National Park
Mountains of Park County, Wyoming